The crab-eating macaque (Macaca fascicularis), also known as the long-tailed macaque and referred to as the cynomolgus monkey in laboratories, is a cercopithecine primate native to Southeast Asia. A species of macaque, the crab-eating macaque has a long history alongside humans. The species has been alternately seen as an agricultural pest, a sacred animal, and, more recently, the subject of medical experiments.

The crab-eating macaque lives in matrilineal social groups of up to eight individuals dominated by females. Male members leave the group when they reach puberty. It is an opportunistic omnivore and has been documented using tools to obtain food in Thailand and Myanmar. The crab-eating macaque is a known invasive species and a threat to biodiversity in several locations, including Hong Kong and western New Guinea. The significant overlap in macaque and human living space has resulted in greater habitat loss, synanthropic living, and inter- and intraspecies conflicts over resources.

Etymology
Macaca comes from the Portuguese word macaco, which was derived from makaku, a word in Ibinda, a language of Central Africa (kaku means monkey in Ibinda). The specific epithet fascicularis is Latin for a small band or stripe. Sir Thomas Raffles, who gave the animal its scientific name in 1821, did not specify what he meant by the use of this word.

In Indonesia and Malaysia, M. fascicularis and other macaque species are known generically as kera, possibly because of their high-pitched cries.

The crab-eating macaque has several common names. It is often referred to as the long-tailed macaque due to its tail, which is often longer than its body. The name crab-eating macaque refers to its being often seen foraging beaches for crabs. Another common name for M. fascicularis is the cynomolgus monkey, from the name of a race of humans with long hair and handsome beards who used dogs for hunting according to Aristophanes of Byzantium, who seemingly derived the etymology of the word cynomolgus from the Greek κύων, cyon 'dog' (gen. cyno-s) and the verb ἀμέλγειν, amelgein 'to milk' (adj. amolg-os), by claiming that they milked female dogs. This name is commonly used in laboratory settings.

In Thailand, the species is called "ลิงแสม" (Ling s̄æm; literally 'mangrove monkeys') because it lives and forages in mangrove forests.

Taxonomy
The 10 subspecies of M. fascicularis are:
 Common long-tailed macaque, M. f. fascicularis
 Burmese long-tailed macaque, M. f. aurea
 Nicobar long-tailed macaque, M. f. umbrosa
 Dark-crowned long-tailed macaque, M. f. atriceps
 Con Song long-tailed macaque, M. f. condorensis
 Simeulue long-tailed macaque, M. f. fusca
 Lasia long-tailed macaque, M. f. lasiae
 Maratua long-tailed macaque, M. f. tua
 Kemujan long-tailed macaque, M. f. karimondjawae
 Philippine long-tailed macaque, M. f. philippensis

Physical characteristics

The upper parts of the body are dark brown with light golden brown tips. The under parts are light grey with a dark grey/brown tail. Crab-eating macaques have backwards-directed crown hairs which sometimes form short crests on the midline. Their skin is black on their feet and ears, whereas the skin on the muzzle is a light grayish pink color. The eyelids often have prominent white markings and sometimes there are white spots on the ears. Males have a characteristic mustache and cheek whiskers, while females have only cheek whiskers. Crab-eating macaques have a cheek pouch which they use to store food while foraging. Females show no perineal swelling.

Behavior

Group living

Macaques live in social groups that contain three to 20 females, their offspring, and one or many males. The groups usually have fewer males than females. In social groups of macaques, a clear dominance hierarchy is seen among females. These ranks remain stable throughout the female's lifetime and also can be sustained through generations of matrilines. Females have their highest birth rates around 10 years of age and completely stop bearing young by age 24.

The social groups of macaques are female-bonded, meaning the males will disperse at the time of puberty. Thus, group relatedness on average appears to be lower than compared to matrilines.  More difference in relatedness occurs when comparing high-ranking lineages to lower ranking lineages, with higher-ranking individuals being more closely related to one another. Additionally, groups of dispersing males born into the same social groups display a range of relatedness, at times appearing to be brothers, while at other times appearing to be unrelated.

In addition to the matrilineal dominance hierarchy, male dominance rankings also exist.  Alpha males have a higher frequency of mating compared to their lower-ranking conspecifics. The increased success is due partially to his increased access to females and also due to female preference of an alpha male during periods of maximum fertility. Though females have a preference for alpha males, they do display promiscuous behavior. Through this behavior, females risk helping to rear a nonalpha offspring, yet benefit in two specific ways, both in regard to aggressive behavior. First, a decreased value is placed on one single copulation. Moreover, the risk of infanticide is decreased due to the uncertainty of paternity.

Increasing group size leads to increased competition and energy spent trying to forage for resources, and in particular, food. Further, social tensions build and the prevalence of tension-reducing interactions like social grooming fall with larger groups. Thus, group living appears to be maintained solely due to the safety against predation.

Crab-eating macaques sometimes form mixed species groups with other primate species, including the southern pig-tailed macaque, dusky langur and white-thighed surili.  They have been observed engaging in grooming with other primate species, including the southern pig-tailed macaque and leaf monkeys such as Raffles' banded langur and the dusty langur.

Conflict
Group living in all species is dependent on the tolerance of other group members. In crab-eating macaques, successful social group living requires postconflict resolution. Usually, less dominant individuals lose to a higher-ranking individual when conflict arises. After the conflict has taken place, lower-ranking individuals tend to fear the winner of the conflict to a greater degree. In one study, this was seen in the ability to drink water together. Postconflict observations showed a staggered time between when the dominant individual begins to drink and the subordinate. Long-term studies reveal the gap in drinking time closes as the conflict moves further into the past.

Grooming and support in conflict among primates is considered to be an act of reciprocal altruism. In crab-eating macaques, an experiment was performed in which individuals were given the opportunity to groom one another under three conditions: after being groomed by the other, after grooming the other, and without prior grooming. After grooming took place, the individual that received the grooming was much more likely to support their groomer than one that had not previously groomed that individual. These results support the reciprocal altruism theory of grooming in long-tailed macaques.

Crab-eating macaques demonstrate two of the three forms of suggested postconflict behavior. In both captive and wild studies, the monkeys demonstrated reconciliation, or an affiliative interaction between former opponents, and redirection, or acting aggressively towards a third individual. Consolation was not seen in any study performed.

Postconflict anxiety has been reported in crab-eating macaques that have acted as the aggressor. After a conflict within a group, the aggressor appears to scratch itself at a higher rate than before the conflict. Though the scratching behavior cannot definitely be termed as an anxious behavior, evidence suggests this is the case. An aggressor's scratching decreases significantly after reconciliation. This suggests reconciliation rather than a property of the conflict is the cause of the reduction in scratching behavior. Though these results seem counterintuitive, the anxiety of the aggressor appears to have a basis in the risks of ruining cooperative relationships with the opponent.

Kin altruism and spite

In a study, a group of crab-eating macaques was given ownership of a food object. Unsurprisingly, adult females favored their own offspring by passively, yet preferentially, allowing them to feed on the objects they held. When juveniles were in possession of an object, mothers robbed them and acted aggressively at an increased rate towards their own offspring compared to other juveniles. These observations suggest close proximity influences behavior in ownership, as a mother's kin are closer to her on average. When given a nonfood object and two owners, one being a kin and one not, the rival will choose the older individual to attack regardless of kinship. Though the hypothesis remains that mother-juvenile relationships may facilitate social learning of ownership, the combined results clearly point to aggression towards the least-threatening individual.

A study was conducted in which food was given to 11 females. They were then given a choice to share the food with kin or nonkin. The kin altruism hypothesis suggests the mothers would preferentially give food to their own offspring. Yet eight of the 11 females did not discriminate between kin and nonkin. The remaining three did, in fact, give more food to their kin. The results suggest it was not kin selection, but instead spite that fueled feeding kin preferentially. This is due to the observation that food was given to kin for a significantly longer period of time than needed. The benefit to the mother is decreased due to less food availability for herself and the cost remains great for nonkin due to not receiving food. If these results are correct, crab-eating macaques are unique in the animal kingdom, as they appear not only to behave according to the kin selection theory, but also act spitefully toward one another.

Reproduction

After a gestation period of 162–193 days, the female gives birth to one infant. Infants are born with black fur which will begin to turn to a grey or reddish-brown shade (depending on the subspecies) after about three months of age. This natal coat may indicate to others the status of the infant, and other group members treat infants with care and rush to their defense when distressed. Immigrant males sometimes kill infants not their own in order to shorten interbirth intervals. High-ranking females will sometimes kidnap the infants of lower-ranking females. These kidnappings can result in the death of the infants, as the other female is usually not lactating. A young juvenile stays mainly with its mother and relatives. As male juveniles get older, they become more peripheral to the group. Here they play together, forming crucial bonds that may help them when they leave their natal group. Males that emigrate with a partner are more successful than those that leave alone. Young females, though, stay with the group and become incorporated into the matriline into which they were born.

Male crab-eating macaques groom females to increase the chance of mating. A female is more likely to engage in sexual activity with a male that has recently groomed her than with one that has not.

Diet

Despite its name, the crab-eating macaque typically does not consume crabs; rather, it is an opportunistic omnivore, eating a variety of animals and plants. Although fruits and seeds make up 60 - 90% of its diet, it also eat leaves, flowers, roots, and bark. It sometimes preys on vertebrates including bird chicks, nesting female birds, lizards, frogs, and fish, invertebrates, and bird eggs. In Indonesia, it has become a proficient swimmer and diver for crabs and other crustaceans in mangrove swamps.  In Bukit Timah, Singapore its diet consists of 44% fruit, 27% animal matter, 15% flowers and other plant matter, and 14% food provided by humans.

The crab-eating macaque exhibits particularly low tolerance for swallowing seeds. This decision to spit seeds is thought to be adaptive; it avoids filling the monkey's stomach with wasteful bulky seeds that cannot be used for energy. It also can help the plants by distributing seeds to new areas:  Crab-eating macaques eat durians such as Durio graveolens and D. zibethinus, and are a major seed disperser for the latter species.

Although the crab-eating macaque is ecologically well-adapted and poses no threat to population stability of prey species in its native range, in areas where it is not native, it can pose a substantial threat to biodiversity. Some believe the crab-eating macaque is responsible for the extinction of forest birds by threatening critical breeding areas  as well as eating the eggs and chicks of endangered forest birds.

The crab-eating macaque can become a synanthrope, living off human resources. It feeds in cultivated fields on young dry rice, cassava leaves, rubber fruit, taro plants, coconuts, mangos, and other crops, often causing significant losses to local farmers. In villages, towns, and cities, it frequently takes food from garbage cans and refuse piles. It can become unafraid of humans in these conditions, which can lead to macaques directly taking food from people, both passively and aggressively.

Tool use

In Thailand and Myanmar, crab-eating macaques use stone tools to open nuts, oysters and other bivalves, and various types of sea snails (nerites, muricids, trochids, etc.) along the Andaman sea coast and offshore islands.

Another instance of tool use is washing and rubbing foods such as sweet potatoes, cassava roots, and papaya leaves before consumption. Crab-eating macaques either soak these foods in water or rub them through their hands as if to clean them. They also peel the sweet potatoes, using their incisors and canine teeth. Adolescents appear to acquire these behaviors by observational learning of older individuals.

Distribution and habitat
The crab-eating macaque lives in a wide variety of habitats, including primary lowland rainforests, disturbed and secondary rainforests, shrubland, and riverine and coastal forests of nipa palm and mangrove. They also easily adjust to human settlements; they are considered sacred at some Hindu temples and on some small islands, but are pests around farms and villages. Typically, they prefer disturbed habitats and forest periphery. The native range of this species includes most of mainland Southeast Asia, from extreme southeastern Bangladesh south through the Malay Peninsula and Singapore, the Maritime Southeast Asia islands of Sumatra, Java, and Borneo, offshore islands, the islands of the Philippines, and the Nicobar Islands in the Bay of Bengal. This primate is a rare example of a terrestrial mammal that violates the Wallace line.

Introduced range
The crab-eating macaque is an introduced alien species in several countries, including Hong Kong, Taiwan, West Papua, Papua New Guinea, New Britain, New Ireland, New Caledonia, Solomon Islands, Fiji, Tonga, Samoa, Nauru, Vanuatu, Pohnpei, Anggaur Island in Palau, and Mauritius. This has led the Invasive Species Specialist Group of the International Union for Conservation of Nature to list the crab-eating macaque as one of the "100 of the World's Worst Invasive Alien Species". In Mauritius, it is a threat for the endemic and endangered Roussea simplex, as it destroys its flowers. It also hinders germination of some endemic trees by destroying most of their fruits when unripe and competes with the endemic endangered Mauritian flying fox for native fruits.

Where it is not a native species, particularly on island ecosystems whose species often evolved in isolation from large predators, it is a documented threat to many native species. The immunovaccine porcine zona pellucida (PZP), which causes infertility in females, is currently being tested in Hong Kong to investigate its use as potential population control.

Relationship with humans

Crab-eating macaques extensively overlap with humans across their range in Southeast Asia. Consequently, they live together in many locations. Some of these areas are associated with religious sites and local customs, such as the temples of Bali in Indonesia, Thailand, and Cambodia, while other areas are characterized by conflict as a result of habitat loss and competition over food and space. Humans and crab-eating macaques have shared environments since prehistoric times, and both tend to frequent forest and river edge habitats. Crab-eating macaques are occasionally used as a food source for some indigenous forest-dwelling peoples. In Mauritius, they are captured and sold to the pharmaceutical industry, and in Angaur and Palau, they are sold as pets. Macaques feed on sugarcane and other crops, affecting agriculture and livelihoods, and can be aggressive towards humans. Macaques may carry potentially fatal human diseases, including herpes B virus. In Singapore, they have adapted into the urban environment.

The macaques have also developed a reputation for actively stealing items from humans (cameras, eyeglasses, hats, etc.), then refusing to return their stolen goods until given food in return. This unique form of kleptoparasitism (known as "robbing and bartering") has primarily been observed in smaller groups of macaques living near Hindu temples and tourist-heavy areas, suggesting it is a learned behaviour within social groups, in response to realizing that humans would trade food for their possessions back.

In scientific research
M. fascicularis is also used extensively in medical experiments, in particular those connected with neuroscience and disease. Due to their close physiology, they can share infections with humans. Some cases of concern have been an isolated event of Reston ebolavirus found in a captive-bred population shipped to the US from the Philippines, which was later found to be a strain of Ebola that has no known pathological consequences in humans, unlike the African strains. Furthermore, they are a known carrier of monkey B virus (Herpesvirus simiae), a virus which has produced disease in some lab workers working mainly with rhesus macaques (M. mulatta).  Nafovanny, the largest facility for the captive breeding of nonhuman primates in the world, houses 30,000 macaques . Plasmodium knowlesi, which causes malaria in M. fascicularis, can also infect humans. A few cases have been documented in humans, but for how long humans have been getting infections of this malarial strain is unknown. It is, therefore, not possible to assess if this is a newly emerging health threat, or if just newly discovered due to improved malarial detection techniques. Given the long history of humans and macaques living together in Southeast Asia, it is likely the latter.

The use of crab-eating macaques and other nonhuman primates in experimentation is controversial with critics charging that the experiments are cruel, unnecessary and lead to dubious findings. One of the most well known examples of experiments on crab-eating macaques is the 1981 Silver Spring monkeys case.

In 2014, 21,768 crab-eating macaques were imported in the United States to be used in experimentation.

Conservation status

The crab-eating macaque has the third-largest range of any primate species, behind only humans and rhesus macaques. The IUCN Red List categorizes the species as endangered,  and CITES lists them as Appendix II.  The species' IUCN status was changed in the summer of 2022 from the Least Concern classification in 2020 as a result of declining population resulting from hunting and troublesome interactions with humans, despite its wide range and ability to adapt to different habitats. These interactions include the skyrocketing demand for crab-eating macaques by the medical industry during the Covid-19 pandemic, and the rapid development of the landscape in Southeast Asia. A 2008 review of their populations suggested a need for better monitoring of populations due to increased wild trade and rising levels of human-macaque conflict, which continue to decrease overall population levels despite the species' wide distribution.

Each subspecies faces differing levels of threats, and too little information is available on some subspecies to assess their conditions. The M. f. umbrosa subspecies is likely of important biological significance and has been recommended as a candidate for protection in the Nicobar Islands, where its small, native population has been seriously fragmented, and is listed as vulnerable on the IUCN Red List. The Philippine long-tailed macaque (M. f. philippensis) is listed as near threatened, and M. f. condorensis is vulnerable.  All other subspecies are listed as data deficient and need further study; although recent work is showing M. f. aurea and M. f. karimondjawae need increased protection.  One concern for conservation is, in areas where M. fascicularis is not native, their populations need to be monitored and managed to reduce their impact on native flora and fauna.

Genome 

The genome of the crab-eating macaque has been sequenced.

Clones 
On 24 January 2018, scientists in China reported in the journal Cell the creation of two crab-eating macaque clones, named Zhong Zhong and Hua Hua, using the complex DNA transfer method that produced Dolly the sheep. This makes Zhong Zhong and Hua Hua the first primates to be cloned using the somatic cell nuclear transfer method.

See also 
 Maggie the Macaque
 Prostitution among animals

References

External links 

 Bonadio, C. 2000. "Macaca fascicularis" (On-line), Animal Diversity Web. Accessed March 10, 2006.
 Primate Info Net Macaca fascicularis Factsheet
 ISSG Database: Ecology of Macaca fascicularis
 Primate Info Net: Macaca fascicularis
 BBC Factfile on M. fascicularis
 "Conditions at Nafovanny", video produced by the British Union for the Abolition of Vivisection following an undercover investigation at a captive-breeding facility for long-tailed macaques in Vietnam.
 

crab-eating macaque
Primates of Southeast Asia
Mammals of Oceania
Crab-eating macaque
Mammals of Bangladesh
Mammals of Borneo
Mammals of Brunei
Mammals of Myanmar
Mammals of Cambodia
Mammals of Timor
Mammals of Indonesia
Mammals of Laos
Mammals of Malaysia
Mammals of the Philippines
Mammals of Singapore
Mammals of Thailand
Mammals of Vietnam
Mammals of Fiji
Mammals of Samoa
Mammals of Tonga
Crab-eating macaque
Crab-eating macaque
Crab-eating macaque
Articles containing video clips